The 15th General Assembly of Nova Scotia represented Nova Scotia between 1836 and 1840. The assembly was dissolved on October 21, 1840.

The assembly sat at the pleasure of the Governor of Nova Scotia, Colin Campbell.

Samuel George William Archibald was chosen as speaker for the house.

List of members

Notes:

References
Journal and proceedings of the House of Assembly, 1837 (1837)

Terms of the General Assembly of Nova Scotia
1836 in Canada
1837 in Canada
1838 in Canada
1839 in Canada
1840 in Canada
1836 establishments in Nova Scotia
1840 disestablishments in Nova Scotia